Changge is a county-level city under the administration of the prefecture-level city of Xuchang, in the central part of central Henan Province, China.  In the Han Dynasty, it was known as Changshe. It ranges in latitude from 34° 09' to 34° 20'N and longitude from 113° 34' to 114° 08'E. According to the sixth national population census in 2010, Changge's population is about 687,081. It borders the province capital Zhengzhou to the north, the ancient capitals Luo Yang to the west and Kaifeng to the east, the city is about 21.4 kilometers from the north and South, and 51.9 kilometers east–west.

History
Changge is a historical city, it has a diverse culture. The name of this area Changge has been changed several time, from Changge to Changshe, and finally called as Changge in Sui Dynasty(569 AD). As the name of Changge could be found in Zuo Zhuan, "鲁隐公五年，宋人代郑围长葛”, the place's name has existed since 718BC. It is said that Changge is the place where a famous ancient tribe's chief Ge Tianshi lived, in order to commemorate that period of life, the generations called this region as Changge.

Administrative divisions
As a county-level city, Changge  administers 4 subdistricts, 8 towns, 4 townships and 357 village committees.
Subdistricts

Towns

Townships

Geography and Climate
Changge is Warm Temperate Monsoon climate, there has abundant sunlight and the geothermal is very rich. With four distinct seasons, winters are cool and dry, summers hot and humid, spring begins early and is warm, and autumn provides a reasonable transition. The average annual temperate is about 14.3 ℃, average annual rainfall is 711.1mm, and 217 frost-free days per year. With several rivers come across Changge, its water resources is very rich.

Agriculture and Industry
Changge is one of the eight pilot municipalities, it has a solid foundation of agriculture, and also has diverse industry categories. There are several large-scale enterprise groups, include Huanghe Whirlwind Company, Benma Company, Topin Group Company, etc.

Education
In Ming and Qing Dynasty, there are nearly 200 sites of private school, Confucius college and community-run schools charging with no tuition. Nowadays, Changge government still treasure education industry. There are many schools here, from kindergarten to technical school.
 
 Changge first senior high school

 Changge second senior high school

Celebrity
Zhong Yao (151-230), native of Yingchuan in Yuzhou State (today's Changge), styled himself Yuanchang. He was an important minister in Kingdom of Wei of the Three Kingdoms Period. Zhong Yao was appointed as the tutor of prince, after he died the emperor gave Chenghou as his posthumous title. The most accomplished area for Zhong Yao is in calligraphy, and he was known as the bell King with Jin Dynasty calligraphy Wang Xizhi.

Tourism
Changge, as a city of central China, has a deep history culture. The tourism sights are mostly artificial landscapes which include:
 Shi Gu Relic
 Ge Tian Ecological Park
 Zhong Yuan Iron Buddha
 Fu Ergang Reservoir
 Zhong Zhou Humanities Museum

References

External links
 http://www.changge.gov.cn/
 Encyclopaedia of Chinese Counties,1992. Beijing:China Social Sciences Publishing House.

 
Cities in Henan
County-level divisions of Henan
Xuchang